Mogh Jangan (also Romanized as Mogh Jangān; also known as Mogh Changān) is a village in Kangan Rural District, in the Central District of Jask County, Hormozgan Province, Iran. At the 2006 census, its population was 198, in 40 families.

References 

Populated places in Jask County